Ab Anjir (also Romanized as Āb Ānjīr; also known as Āb Anjīr va Bas Kūtūk, Āvanjīr, and Das Kūtūk) is a village in Kuhak Rural District, in the Central District of Jahrom County, Fars Province, Iran. At the 2006 census, its population was 31, in 9 families.

References 

Populated places in Jahrom County